Róbert Kažimír (born 30 March 1978) is a Slovak former competitive figure skater. He is a four-time national champion and competed for Slovakia at the 1998 Winter Olympics in Nagano, where he placed 26th. His highest placement at an ISU championship was 10th at the 2001 European Championships in Bratislava. Early in his career, Kažimír was coached by Jozef Sabovčík.

Programs

Competitive highlights

References

External links
 

1978 births
Living people
Figure skaters at the 1998 Winter Olympics
Olympic figure skaters of Slovakia
Slovak male single skaters
Sportspeople from Košice